is a scenic ria coastal [inlet located on the Sea of Japan in Iwami, Tottori Prefecture, Japan. This area was nationally designated as a Place of Scenic Beauty and Natural Monument on March 27, 1928 It was also voted one of the 100 Landscapes of Japan in1927.  It is one of the major geosites of San'in Kaigan Global Geopark.

Geography
The Uradome Coast is made up of rocks formed by marine erosion, white sandy beaches, and dense scrub pines. Marine erosion has formed distinctive natural sea walls, cliffs, tunnels, caves, and large rocks of unusual shapes. The Uradome Coast is an important part of the Sanin Kaigan National Park.

The Uradome Coast is known as the "San'in Matsushima" due to its resemblance to Matsushima in Miyagi Prefecture. The author Tōson Shimazaki (1872–1943) was especially fond of the Uradome Coast. He praised the area with the quote "Matsushima is Matsushima, Uradome is Uradome".

Etymology 
The name of the Uradome Coast in Japanese is formed from two kanji. The first, 浦, means "inlet" and the second, 富 means "abundant" or "rich".

Transportation 
The Uradome Coast is to the east in close proximity to the Tottori Sand Dunes. The coast is a 25-minute drive from Tottori Station on the JR West Sanin Main Line.

See also
 List of Places of Scenic Beauty of Japan (Tottori)

External links
浦富海岸
いわみのマップ

References 

Places of Scenic Beauty
Natural monuments of Japan
IUCN Category III
Beaches of Japan
Tourist attractions in Tottori Prefecture
Landforms of Tottori Prefecture
Sea of Japan
Iwami, Tottori